Quelques Portraits-Sonnets de Femmes is a poetry chapbook, by Natalie Clifford Barney, with watercolor illustrations by Alice Pike Barney. It was published in an edition of 500, by Librarie Paul Ollendorf. The poems were dedicated to various women, by initials. The poems were criticized for being conventional. However, the radical subject matter of lesbianism caused a scandal. Her father, Alfred Barney, bought up the copies and plates.

References

1900 poetry books
1900s LGBT literature
American poetry collections
LGBT poetry
Chapbooks
LGBT literature in France
Literature by women